Zhob or Zhobak, formerly known as Appozai or Fort Sandeman, is a city and district capital of Zhob District in Balochistan province of Pakistan. Zhob is located on the banks of Zhob River 337 km from Quetta, the capital of Balochistan.

The city was originally named Appozai after a nearby village. During the British colonial era, it was named Fort Sandeman after the British Indian Army officer, Robert Groves Sandeman. It obtained its current name on 30 July 1976 when the then-Prime Minister of Pakistan, Zulfikar Ali Bhutto had the name changed.

Tourists places
 silyaza One of the most visited Picnic spot of Zhob District, Pakistan. The stream surrounded by the orchards of Apples, Grapes, Almond and Apricots and large No of fields of Maze and wheat. Pashtoon tribe living here are Mandokhail and village named Takai.
 Paryan-o-Ghundi
And Another One is Toor Samanzai, The Village of Great Haji Jalal Gul, He Is known for his bravery, Here we can see the Zaitoon Forests, Visiting place Oboo Shakh, Tarjana Narai, Shaly Narai, Uzgii Ghbarga, Sur Ghundai, And Other Mountain of Grass.

History 
A Chinese pilgrim, Xuanzang, who visited the region in 629 AD mentioned Pashtuns living in Zhob. The prime historical importance of Zhob is having been a cradle of the Pashtuns. Early in the 13th century the country came within the sphere of the Mongol raids organised by Genghis Khan. In 1398 AD, an expedition against the Pashtuns of the area was led by Pir Muhammad, the grandson of Amir Timur. Although no authentic information exists about any foreign occupation, many forts, mounds and karizes are attributed to the Mughals. Both Nadir Shah (1736-47 AD) and Ahmed Shah Abdali (1747-73 AD) extended their power through Balochistan and thenceforth Zhob remained under the more or less nominal suzerainty of the Durranis and Barakzais until it came under British protection.

In the middle of the 18th century, Ahmed Shah granted a sanad (certificate) to Bekar Nika, fourth in descent from Jogi and the head of the Jogizai family, conferring upon him the title and position of "Badshah or Ruler of Zhob". This family continued to exercise authority over the Kakars until the British were first brought into contact with them.

Until the Zhob Valley expedition of 1884 the area was practically unknown to Europeans, and in 1889 the Zhob Valley and Gomal Pass were taken under the control of the British Government. In December 1889 the town of Zhob, then known as Apozai, was occupied by the British and named Fort Sandeman after Sir Robert Sandeman.

The district of Zhob was formed in 1890, with Fort Sandeman as the capital. The population was 3552, according to the 1901 census of India. The military garrison included a native cavalry and a native infantry regiment. It was also the headquarters of the Zhob Levy Corps. In 1894 a supply of water from the Saliaza valley was established, allowing irrigation and planting of fruits and trees and providing drinking water. It cost a little over a lakh of rupees.

The military lines, bazaar, dispensaries, and school lay below. During this time the railway system was built. The nearest railway station in Baluchistan is Harnai,  distant. Bhakkar, the railway station for Dera Ismail Khan, is  distant. The population numbered 3,552 in 1901.

A local fund was created in 1890; the income during 1903-4 was 18,000 rupees and the expenditure 17,000 rupees. One-third of the net receipts from octroi was paid over to the military authorities.

Zhob is also the location of a Pakistan Army cantonment. Semi nomadic people from various provinces or Afghanistan migrate to Zhob amid the weather of the city. Tribes known for migration include Yusafzai, Tarakai, Mehsud, Wazir etc.

Demographics
Zhob is predominately Pashtun. According to the census of 2017, the total population of Zhob City is 46,164, while the population of Zhob District is 310,544. The average annual growth rate is 2.52% from 1998 to 2017.

Climate
Zhob has a semi-arid climate (Köppen BSh), its rainfall being high enough to avoid the arid climate category found at lower elevations. Unlike most of Balochistan, Zhob does on occasions receive rainfall from the monsoon, though this occurs very erratically.

Transport

Roads
However, the road linking with Dera Ismail Khan is mostly a track passing through water streams and almost all of the road is metalloid. The Quetta to Zhob National highway has been completed recently on the expenditure of 7 billion rupees by NHA in five years in two shifts (Quetta-Killasaifulah and Killasaifulah-Zhob).
Zhob has an important link with Khyber Pakhtunkhwa because it connects Balochistan with Khyber Pakhtunkhwa and then with Punjab; originally it took 12 hours or more to reach Dera Ismail Khan, but now it is distance of almost 4 hours. On this route there is a heavy traffic of cargo and goods carrying vehicles to Khyber Pakhtunkhwa and Punjab. The route is very convenient for transportation between Punjab and Balochistan. This road is very important for carrying goods from province Khyber Pakhtunkhwa to the sea port of Karachi.

Railway
Zhob is linked by rail with the Pakistan Railways network. In 2006, the Pakistan Railways converted the narrow gauge railway track into a broad gauge. The Zhob line splits off the Chaman line north of Quetta at Bostan. A more direct route to the capital via Dera Ismail Khan and Darya Khan is also proposed. The new project will link Quetta with Peshawar via Bostan, Zhob, Dera Ismail Khan, Bannu and Kohat.

Airport

The Civil Aviation Authority of Pakistan constructed an airport at Zhob with a  runway that links Zhob by air with the major cities of Pakistan.

See also 
 Zhob District
 Zhob River
 Zhob Airport
 Paryan-o-Ghundi - a destroyed archaeological site near Zhob

Notes

Populated places in Zhob District